Aechmea mertensii is a plant species in the genus Aechmea. This species is native to Bolivia, Brazil, Colombia, Ecuador, Guyana, French Guiana, Peru, Suriname, and Venezuela.

References

mertensii
Flora of South America
Plants described in 1818